This is a list of seasons completed by the Michigan State Spartans men's college basketball team.

History

Season-by-season results

Updated through March 9, 2023

  George Gauthier left after 29 games in 1919–20, posting a 15–14 record. Lyman Frimodig coached the final seven games of the season, finishing 6–1.
  Due to forfeits related to NCAA sanctions to Minnesota for improper selling of tickets, MSU's official record for the 1976–77 season is 12–15, 9–9 though they finished the season 10–17, 7–11.
  Due to NCAA sanctions against Wisconsin for providing improper benefits for players, MSU's official record for the 1981–82 season is 12–16, 7–11 though they finished the season 11–17, 6–12. The official record for the 1983–84 season is 16–12, 9–9 though they finished the season 15–13, 8–10

References

Michigan State
Michigan State Spartans basketball seasons